The Viðreisn (officially known in English as Liberal Reform Party) is a liberal centre to centre-right political party in Iceland that was founded on 24 May 2016 but had existed as a political network since June 2014. It split from the Independence Party, mainly over discontent with its decision not to hold a referendum on joining the European Union and lack of support for free-trade.

The party supports Icelandic EU membership, and reform of farming subsidies and protective excise taxes on foreign produce. It wants public policy to focus on the general interest of society and reduce influence from special interests. Viðreisn is in favor of a publicly financed welfare state. It supports pegging the króna to another currency, such as the euro, through a currency board as a plan to lower interest rates. Its healthcare policy aims at reducing the patient's share of healthcare costs.

Viðreisn has been assigned the list letter C. It participated in the 2016 elections to the Althing (Icelandic parliament) and won seven seats.

Electoral results

Party chairperson

References

External links
 Official website

2014 establishments in Iceland
Centrist parties in Europe
Centre-right parties in Europe
Political parties established in 2014
Liberal parties in Iceland
Classical liberal parties
Green liberalism
Independence Party (Iceland)
Pro-European political parties in Iceland